John William Wallace (born 1 April 1962 in Burlington, Ontario) is a retired rower from Canada. He competed in two consecutive Summer Olympics for his native country, starting in 1988.

At his second appearance, he was a member of the team that won the gold medal in the Men's Eights. He was once married to fellow rower Silken Laumann, and he is brother-in-law to Daniele Laumann.

References 
 Canadian Olympic Committee
 

1962 births
Living people
Canadian male rowers
Olympic rowers of Canada
Olympic gold medalists for Canada
Rowers at the 1988 Summer Olympics
Rowers at the 1992 Summer Olympics
Sportspeople from Burlington, Ontario
Olympic medalists in rowing
Medalists at the 1992 Summer Olympics